is a Japanese manga series written and illustrated by Fe. It has been serialized in Media Factory's shōjo manga magazine Monthly Comic Gene since October 2015. The manga is licensed in North America by Yen Press. An anime television series adaptation by Platinum Vision aired from January to March 2022.

Plot
During one of her bounty hunter missions, Chateau Dankworth comes across Song Ryang-ha, a professional hitman, who begins stalking and brokering her information in exchange for a date. Though reluctant, Chateau complies yet refuses to open up to him. Despite this, Ryang-ha continues to save her when she is under attack and seems to know her past.

After Chateau and Ryang-ha both become targeted by Donald Bachmann, the two are forced to confront their common past: Chateau is the daughter of the heir to the Nobel family, a lineage of French aristocrats, who becomes targeted by Nelson Nobel, her father's stepbrother. The real Song Ryang-ha was ordered to escort her to safety, but she accidentally inflicts a fatal gunshot wound on him out of fear; meanwhile, the current Ryang-ha, a nameless victim of child trafficking saved by the real Ryang-ha, adopts his name after the latter dies.

Characters

Chateau is a newly recruited bounty hunter working for Ritzland Support. She is reluctant to trust Ryang-ha and constantly rejects his romantic advances. After she is captured by Donald, she is forced to remember that her true name is Chateau Nobel, the daughter of the heir to the Nobel family, who was escorted by the real Song Ryang-ha after her father's stepbrother ordered the Hong Kong triads to assassinate him. Chateau accidentally inflicted a fatal gunshot wound on the real Ryang-ha during the mission and went into a catatonic state, until she was found by Officer Dankworth. Despite knowing her true identity, Chateau rejects her nobility and declares herself to be a member of the Dankworth family.

Ryang-ha is a hitman wanted by at least 20 organizations for singlehandedly taking down the Hong Kong triads. Since meeting Chateau, he stalks and brokers her information in exchange for spending time with her. After the two go on the run from Donald, flashbacks from their past reveal that he is a nameless victim of child trafficking who was saved by the real Song Ryang-ha and adopts his name after the latter dies.

Ritzland is the owner of Ritzland Support and is married to a 25-year-old entrepreneur.

Indian, whose real name and personal details are unknown, is an immigrant from India working as a secretary at Ritzland Support. He is named  in the anime adaptation.

 
The real Song Ryang-ha is a Korean student and apprentice of Donald Bachmann. He was ordered to escort Chateau to safety, but on the way, he took in the current Song Ryang-ha to save him from child trafficking. After Chateau accidentally kills him, the current Song Ryang-ha adopts his name.

Media

Manga
Love of Kill is a manga series written and illustrated by Fe. Fe first published the story on Pixiv under the title  in October 2012 and gained over 5.4 million views on the website. Fe followed up with a sequel titled . Within three years of the stories being published, it was picked up for serialization by Media Factory's shōjo manga magazine Monthly Comic Gene since October 2015 and has been collected in thirteen tankōbon volumes. In November 2022, the series reached its climax, with the series ending in January 2023.

A drama CD adaptation was released as a bonus item bundled with the physical release of the March 2018 issue of Monthly Comic Gene, released on February 15, 2018.

In October 2020, Love of Kill was licensed in English for North America distribution by Yen Press.

Volumes

Anime
On December 11, 2020, Kadokawa announced that an anime television series adaptation is in production. The series is animated by Platinum Vision and directed by Hideaki Ōba, with Ayumu Hisao handling the series' scripts, Yōko Satō designing the characters, and Kei Yoshikawa composing the music. It aired from January 13 to March 31, 2022, on Tokyo MX and other networks. The opening theme song is "Midnight Dancer" by Toshiki Masuda, while the ending theme song is "Makoto Period" by Aika Kobayashi. Crunchyroll has licensed the series.

On January 13, 2022, Crunchyroll announced that the series will receive an English dub, which will premiere on February 23.

Episode list

Notes

References

External links
 

2022 anime television series debuts
Anime series based on manga
Crunchyroll anime
Media Factory manga
Mystery anime and manga
Organized crime in anime and manga
Platinum Vision
Romance anime and manga
Shōjo manga
Suspense anime and manga
Yen Press titles